Sames I (also spelled Samos I), was the Orontid king of Sophene and Commagene, ruling around 260 BC.

Name 
The name of "Samos" is possibly derived from the Avestan name Sāma, the father of the Avestan hero Garshasp, which would indicate some sort of custom of Iranian religious or epic lore amongst the Orontids.

Biography 
The Kingdom of Sophene was ruled by the Orontid dynasty of Iranian origin, which was descended from Orontes I, a Bactrian nobleman who was the son-in-law of the Achaemenid King of Kings Artaxerxes II. According to the Greek writer Strabo (died 24 AD) in his Geographica, Sophene first emerged as a distinct kingdom under Zariadres, who was installed as its ruler by the Seleucid king Antiochus III the Great. He further adds that following the defeat of Antiochus III against the Romans, Zariadres declared independence. However this report is strongly contradicted by epigraphic and numismatic evidence. Sophene most likely emerged as a distinct kingdom in the 3rd-century BC, during the gradual decline of Seleucid influence in the Near East and the split of the Orontid dynasty into several branches. Three rulers belonging to a different Orontid branch, Sames I, Arsames I and Xerxes ruled the western part of Greater Armenia, perhaps from Commagene to Arzanene.

Building activity 
Sometime before 245 BC, Sames I refounded the city of Samosata on the previous Neo-Hittite site of Kummuh. He may have refounded the city in order to assert his claim over the area, a common practice amongst Iranian and Hellenistic dynasties, such as Cappadocia, Pontus, Parthia and Armenia. The city was built in a "sub-Achaemenid" Persian architectural form, similar to the rest of Orontid buildings in Greater Armenia. Naming cities such as Samosata (Middle Persian *Sāmašād; Old Persian *Sāmašiyāti-) the "joy of" or "happiness of" was a Orontid (and later Artaxiad) practice that recalled the Achaemenid royal discourse. Samosata served as one of the most important royal residences of the Orontid kings of Sophene.

Coinage 
Similar to the early Arsacids of Parthia and Frataraka of Persis, the Orontids of Sophene experimented with images of Iranian royal power. On his coins, Sames I is shown as clean-shaven and wearing the kyrbasia, a type of headgear originally worn by the satraps of the Achaemenid Empire. The tip of Sames I's kyrbasia is more prominent, similar to that of the headgear worn by the early Ariarathids of Cappadocia.

References

Sources
 
 
 
 
 
 

3rd-century BC rulers in Asia
Kings of Sophene
Kings of Commagene